Howell House may refer to:

in the United States (by state then city)
Storm Cellar, William Howell House, listed on the National Register of Historic Places in White County
Howell-Garner-Monfee House, North Little Rock, Arkansas, listed on the NRHP in Pulaski County
Howell House (Escondido, California), listed on the National Register of Historic Places in San Diego County
Mrs. George Arthur Howell Jr. House, Atlanta, Georgia, listed on the National Register of Historic Places in Fulton County
William Dean Howells House (Cambridge, Massachusetts), listed on the NRHP in Middlesex County
Howell House (Reno, Nevada), listed on the NRHP in Washoe County
Benjamin Howell Homestead, Parsippany, New Jersey, listed on the NRHP in Morris County
Edgar W. Howell House, Buffalo, New York, listed on the NRHP in Erie County
Howell-Butler House, Roseboro, North Carolina, listed on the NRHP in Sampson County
Howell Homeplace, Tarboro, North Carolina, listed on the NRHP in Edgecombe County
Alden and Thomasene Howell House, Waynesville, North Carolina, listed on the NRHP in Hayward County
John W. Howell House, Monmouth, Oregon, listed on the NRHP in Polk County
Howell-Kohlhagen House, Roseburg, Oregon, listed on the NRHP in Douglas County
Bybee–Howell House, Sauvie Island, Oregon, listed on the NRHP in Multnomah County
Howell House (Philadelphia, Pennsylvania), listed on the NRHP in Philadelphia County
Howell-Theurer House, Wellsville, Utah, listed on the NRHP in Cache County